1962 Emperor's Cup Final was the 42nd final of the Emperor's Cup competition. The final was played at Nishikyogoku Athletic Stadium in Kyoto on May 6, 1962. Chuo University won the championship.

Overview
Chuo University won the championship, by defeating defending champion Furukawa Electric 2–1.

Match details

See also
1962 Emperor's Cup

References

Emperor's Cup
1962 in Japanese football
JEF United Chiba matches